Seizing Justice: The Greensboro 4 is a 2010 television documentary film by Lynn Kessler for the Smithsonian Channel.  It tells the story of The Greensboro Four through photographs, archival footage and interviews from Joseph McNeil, David Richmond, Franklin McCain and Jibreel Khazan, three of the four men who began the sit-in at Woolworth's in 1960 to protest segregation practices. The film also includes interviews from historians from the Smithsonian Museum of American History and civil right leader and congressman John Lewis.

The film aired on July 25, 2010 on the Smithsonian Channel.

See also 

 Civil rights movement in popular culture
 February One: The Story of the Greensboro Four
 February One monument and sculpture
 Sit-in movement

References

External links 

 
 Seizing Justice on the Smithsonian Channel website:  Includes videos and biographies of the sit-in leaders.

American documentary television films
2010 television films
2010 films
Documentary films about the civil rights movement
F. W. Woolworth Company
2010s English-language films
2010s American films